Ramiro II  may refer to:
Ramiro II of León (died 951)
Ramiro II of Aragon (died 1157)